Little Heaven is an unincorporated community  in Kent County, Delaware,  United States. It is north of Frederica at the interchange between Delaware Route 1 and Bowers Beach Road/Clapham Road.

It originated in a group of cabins built by local farmer Jahu Reed in the 1870s for the Irish workers he employed in his orchards.  The Jehu Reed House was listed on the National Register of Historic Places in 1973.

Notable person
Traves Brownlee, Vice presidential candidate of the American Party in the 1984 United States presidential election

References

External links

Unincorporated communities in Kent County, Delaware
Unincorporated communities in Delaware